Mataeomera ligata is a species of moth of the family Erebidae first described by Thomas Pennington Lucas in 1895. It is found in Australia.

References

Boletobiinae